The 2011 NCAA Division III Men's Ice Hockey Tournament was the culmination of the 2010–11 season, the 28th such tournament in NCAA history. It concluded with St. Norbert defeating Adrian in the championship game 4-3. All First Round and Quarterfinal matchups were held at home team venues, while all succeeding games were played at the Ridder Arena in Minneapolis, Minnesota.

Qualifying teams
The following teams qualified for the tournament. Automatic bids were offered to the conference tournament champion of seven different conferences. Four at-large bids were available for the highest-ranked non-conference tournament champions (overall seed in parentheses).

Format
The tournament featured four rounds of play. All rounds were Single-game elimination. The top four ranked teams received byes into the quarterfinal round  and were arranged so that were they all to reach the national semifinal, the first overall seed would play the fourth seed while the second seed would play the third seed.

The two lowest-seeded western teams were placed in the same first round match with the winner advancing to play the top western seed which was also the first overall seed. The eastern teams were arranged so that if the third seed were to win it would advance to play the fourth overall seed, if the fourth eastern seed were to win it would play the third overall seed and if the fifth eastern seed were to win it would advance to play the second overall seed. 

Because the third overall seed was a western team, the fourth eastern seed was advanced to quarterfinal round so that it would have time to travel. This caused the third eastern team to play the seventh eastern seed and the fifth eastern seed to play the sixth eastern seed in the first round. In the First Round and Quarterfinals the higher-seeded team served as host.

Tournament Bracket

Note: * denotes overtime period(s)

All-Tournament Team
G: B. J. O'Brien* (St. Norbert)
D: Jeremy Klaver (Adrian)
D: Nick Tabisz (St. Norbert)
F: Cody Keffer (St. Norbert)
F: Andrew Mather (Oswego State)
F: Shawn Skelly (Adrian)
* Most Outstanding Player(s)

Record by conference

References

External links
Division III Men's Ice Hockey Record Book

 
NCAA Division III ice hockey